Thebes or Thebae or Thebai was a port town of ancient Ionia, under the Mycale mountains. 

Its site is located west of Doğanbey, Asiatic Turkey.

References

Populated places in ancient Ionia
Former populated places in Turkey